HD 15524 is a wide binary star in the northern zodiac constellation of Aries. The secondary, separated from the primary by 12.4 arcseconds, has an apparent magnitude of 10.4.

This system is the likely source of X-ray emission coming from these coordinates.

References

F-type main-sequence stars
F-type subgiants
Double stars
Aries (constellation)
Durchmusterung objects
015524
011670
0728